The Governor of Tver Oblast is the head of Tver Oblast, the federal subject of Russia. Governor is elected by the people of Tver Oblast for five years.

The current governor is Igor Rudenya.

List

Timeline

Elections

1995 

|-
! Candidate !! Description !! %
|-
| Vladimir Platov
| Mayor of Bezhetsk
| 50.50%
|-
| Vladimir Suslov
| Incumbent head of administration
| 35.16%
|-
| Yury Dontsov
| Entrepreneur
| 4.75%
|-
| Viktor Linov
| Chairman of Staritsky District consumers' co-operative
| 1.55%
|-
| colspan=2| Against all
| 6.73%
|-
| colspan=3|Source:
|}

1999–2000 

|-
! rowspan=2|Candidate !! colspan=2; rowspan=2| Party !! rowspan=2|Description !! colspan=2|1st round !! colspan=2|2nd round
|-
! Votes !! % !! Votes !! % 
|-
| Vladimir Platov
| bgcolor="" |
| Unity
| Incumbent governor
| 257,483
| 32.51%
| 299,869
| 46.96%
|-
| Vladimir Bayunov
| bgcolor="" |
| Communist Party
| Member of the State Duma
| 181,413
| 22.91%
| 296,458
| 46.43%
|-
| Sergey Potapov
| bgcolor="" |
| Independent
| Member of the Legislative Assembly
| 98,911
| 12.49%
! rowspan=9; colspan=2|
|-
| Gennady Vinogradov
| bgcolor="" |
| Yabloko
| Employee at regional office of the Bank of Russia
| 47,115
| 5.95%
|-
| Nikolay Popov
| bgcolor="" |
| Independent
| Member of the Legislative Assembly
| 43,494
| 5.49%
|-
| Viktor Opekunov
| bgcolor="" |
| Fatherland – All Russia
| First deputy governor
| 29,490
| 3.72%
|-
| Andrey Stroyev
| bgcolor="" |
| Independent
| Entrepreneur
| 29,350
| 3.71%
|-
| Andrey Trachenko
| bgcolor="" |
| Independent
| Deputy general director of Rumelco LLC
| 21,882
| 2.76%
|-
| Anatoly Kleymenov
| bgcolor="" |
| Independent
| Chairman of the economics committee of Tver Oblast administration
| 12,331
| 1.56%
|-
| Vasily Smirnov
| bgcolor="#19348F"|
| Conservative Party of Entrepreneurs
| Chairman of regional branch of the Conservative Party of Entrepreneurs
| 10,166
| 1.28%
|-
| Arnold Pork
| bgcolor="" |
| Independent
| Vice president of Trans Nafta CJSC
| 2,461
| 0.31%
|-
| Against all
| bgcolor=black |
| colspan=2|
| 48,930
| 6.18%
| 42,231
| 6.61%
|-
| colspan=4|Invalid ballots
| 8,893
!
| 5,618
!
|-
|colspan=8|Source:
|}

2003 

|-
! rowspan=2|Candidate !! colspan=2; rowspan=2| Party !! rowspan=2|Description !! colspan=2|1st round !! colspan=2|2nd round
|-
! Votes !! % !! Votes !! % 
|-
| Dmitry Zelenin
| bgcolor="" align=center|
| United Russia
| Deputy Chairman of the state committee for physical culture and sports
| 291,533
| 42.49%
| 283,438
| 57.42%
|-
| Igor Zubov
| bgcolor="" |
| Independent
| Former deputy minister of internal affairs
| 100,119
| 14.59%
| 167,074
| 33.85%
|-
| Tatyana Astrakhankina
| bgcolor="" |
| Communist Party
| Member of the State Duma
| 88,160
| 12.85%
! rowspan=9; colspan=2|
|-
| Vladimir Platov
| bgcolor="" |
| Independent
| Incumbent governor
| 85,455
| 12.45%
|-
| Aleksandr Kharchenko
| bgcolor="" |
| Independent
| Mayor of Rzhev
| 33,894
| 4.94%
|-
| Yury Krasnov
| bgcolor="" |
| Independent
|
| 26,808
| 3.91%
|-
| Yury Tseberganov
| bgcolor="" |
| Independent
| Chief federal inspector for Tver Oblast
| 11,566
| 1.69%
|-
| Aleksandr Ipatov
| bgcolor="" |
| Independent
| Deputy governor
| 5,293
| 0.77%
|-
| Konstantin Fokin
| bgcolor="" |
| Independent
|
| 4,953
| 0.72%
|-
| Aleksandr Anzhinovsky
| bgcolor="" |
| Independent
|
| 3,477
| 0.51%
|-
| Viktor Isakov
| bgcolor="" |
| Independent
|
| 911
| 0.13%
|-
| Against all
| bgcolor=black |
| colspan=2|
| 34,028
| 4.96%
| 43,124
| 8.74%
|-
|colspan=8|Source:
|}

2007 

|-
! Candidate !! colspan=2| Party !! Description !! For !! Against !! Abstained !! Did not vote
|-
| Dmitry Zelenin
| bgcolor="" align=center|
| United Russia
| Incumbent governor
| 
| 
| 
| 
|-
|colspan=8|Source:
|}

2011 

|-
! Candidate !! colspan=2| Party !! Description !! For !! Against
|-
| Andrey Shevelyov
| bgcolor="" align=center|
| United Russia
| Acting governor, former deputy governor of Ryazan Oblast
| 
| 
|-
|colspan=6|Source:
|}

2016 

|-
! Candidate !! colspan=2| Party !! Description !! Votes !! % !! Map
|-
| Igor Rudenya
| bgcolor="" align=center|
| United Russia
| Acting governor
| 322,997
| 72.1%
|rowspan=5|
|-
| Anton Morozov
| bgcolor="" align=center|
| Liberal Democratic Party
| Member of the State Duma
| 66,042
| 14.74%
|-
| Ilya Kleymenov
| bgcolor="" align=center| 
| Communists of Russia
| Member of Konakovsky District Assembly of Deputies
| 43,509
| 9.71%
|-
|colspan="4"| Valid ballots
| 432,548
| 100%
|-
|colspan=6|Source:
|}

2021

References

 
Tver Oblast
Politics of Tver Oblast